Established in 1930, the All India Ophthalmological Society (AIOS) is a scientific body promoting study in the field of ophthalmology and promoting ophthalmic care and research in India.

History
Under the societies registration act of 1883, AIOS was established in 1930.

Publications 
The Indian Journal of Ophthalmology is a peer-reviewed open-access medical journal published on behalf of the society. It is sent periodically to all the members.

An additional publication, AIOS Times is distributed periodically.

Annual meetings 

AIOS holds an annual conference called the All India Ophthalmological Conference (AIOC) as part of the scientific proceedings of the society.

AIOS 2017 was held in Jaipur.  AIOC 2018 will be the 76th annual conference of the society and will be held in February in Coimbatore, Tamil Nadu.

References

External links 
 

1930 establishments in India
Medical associations based in India
Scientific organizations established in 1930
Ophthalmology organizations
Organisations based in Delhi